

Television

2010s

2000s

1990s

1980s

Radio

2010s

2000s

1990s

1980s

See also 
 List of current National Basketball Association broadcasters

Minnesota Timberwolves
Prime Sports
Fox Sports Networks
Bally Sports